Hervé J. Michaud (28 December 1912 – 5 June 1978) was a Canadian politician, farmer and salesman. Michaud served as a Liberal party member of the House of Commons of Canada and the Senate.

He was born in Bouctouche, New Brunswick. Michaud was educated in New Brunswick at University of St. Joseph's College and at the school of agriculture at Sainte-Anne-de-la-Pocatière, Quebec.

He was first elected at the Kent riding in the 1953 general election, then re-elected there in the 1957 and 1958 elections. He served three consecutive terms from the 22nd through the 24th Parliaments then did not seek another term as of the 1962 election.

Michaud was appointed to the Senate on 15 March 1968 in the Kent senatorial division during the administration of Lester B. Pearson. He remained a Senator until his death on 5 June 1978.

Electoral record

References

External links
 
  Fonds Hervé Michaud (1912-1978) at the University of Moncton

1912 births
1978 deaths
Canadian farmers
Canadian senators from New Brunswick
Members of the House of Commons of Canada from New Brunswick
Liberal Party of Canada MPs
Liberal Party of Canada senators